CSIX may refer to:

 CSIX, common switch interface
 CSix Connect, a social network and weekly gathering of high tech professionals in career transition
 CSIRO Index, abstracts by the Australian Commonwealth Scientific and Industrial Research Organisation (CSIRO)

See also
C6 (disambiguation)